Khasanay (Hasanay) is a rural locality (a selo) in Khasanaysky Selsoviet, Babayurtovsky District, Republic of Dagestan, Russia. The population was 1,017 as of 2010. There are 6 streets.

Geography 
Khasanay is located 8 km northwest of Babayurt (the district's administrative centre) by road. Sovetskoye is the nearest rural locality.

References 

Rural localities in Babayurtovsky District